Yakin Ertürk (born 1945) is a Turkish former United Nations special rapporteur on violence against women and board member of the United Nations Research Institute for Social Development (UNRISD), and was a professor of Sociology.

Early life and education
Ertürk has a B.A. from Hacettepe University (1969) and a Ph.D. in Sociology from Cornell University: her thesis (1980) was on "Rural change in Southeastern Anatolia : an analysis of rural poverty and power structure as a reflection of center-periphery relations in Turkey".

Career
Ertürk held posts at King Saud University (1979-1982), Hacettepe University (1983—1986) and Middle East Technical University (METU) (1986-1987)  before joining the United Nations in 1997 to become Director of the International Research and Training Institute for the Advancement of Women (INSTRAW) in Santo Domingo, Dominican Republic (1997-1999) and then Director of The Division for the Advancement of Women at UN headquarters in New York (1999-2001). She rejoined the faculty of METU in 2002, and was a professor in the Department of Sociology until her retirement, and was also the chair of the university's Gender and Women's Study Programme. She was a Visiting Global Associate, Rutgers University, the Center for Women’s Global Leadership (CWGL) 
	and the Institute for Women’s Leadership (IWL) Consortium (15 Sept. 2017-15 April 
	2018).

In 2003, she was appointed as the United Nations special rapporteur on violence against women, and held this position for six years. 2009-2013, she served on the Council of Europe Committee on the Prevention of Torture.

Selected publications

References

Further reading

External links
 In the UN's World Chronicle series

1945 births
Living people
Turkish women
United Nations special rapporteurs
Hacettepe University alumni
Cornell University alumni
Academic staff of King Saud University
Academic staff of Hacettepe University
Academic staff of Middle East Technical University
Turkish sociologists